Reunited Apart is a ongoing web series created by Josh Gad, first streamed in April 2020. Created during the COVID-19 pandemic, each episode reunites the cast, crew, and related celebrities from a fan-favorite film using video conferencing as Gad interviews them about the film and projects they have done since. Though Gad had initially stated that the series would end with six episodes, he launched a second season in December 2020. The series is aimed to raise money for various charitable efforts.

Production
Gad created the series as a result of being stuck at home during the COVID-19 pandemic, during which he turned to watching films from his childhood which had influenced his own life with his own children. While watching The Goonies, he got the idea of trying to reuniting the cast, and started reaching out to the film's original stars. They were interested and they further were able to reach out to others related to the film such as Cyndi Lauper who had sung the film's theme song, and Steven Spielberg who had produced the film. Gad considered that many of these films would not be possible to make in the current period of Hollywood and were inventive at their time, and thus worthwhile to explore through this series. Further, Gad felt many of these films lack the cynicism that had built up due to the coronavirus and would help alleviate viewers' morale. He stated "I thought, 'How great would it be, at a time when people are longing for simple nostalgia, to bring together casts from some of the iconic films that were part of my journey?'"

Since the first episode, Gad has made efforts to try to get all principle casts for the films, but these efforts don't always pan out, such as lacking Crispin Glover for the Back to the Future reunion or Hugo Weaving for The Lord of the Rings episode.

After the sixth episode featuring the Ferris Bueller's Day Off reunion, Gad had stated that was the final episode of the series. However, Gad released the second season's first episode, featuring Wayne's World, as a surprise in December 2020 and promising more episodes to come.

Episodes

Season 1

Season 2

Reception
Reunited Apart has been compared favorably to Some Good News, another web series created by John Krasinski that was aimed to raised spirits during the pandemic.

References

External links
 Episodes on YouTube
 

2020 web series debuts
2020s American television talk shows
2020s YouTube series
American non-fiction web series
English-language television shows
Television shows about the COVID-19 pandemic
2020s American television news shows